Malcolm Klassen (born in Hammanskraal, Gauteng, South Africa) is a South African professional boxer. He held the IBF super featherweight title twice from 2006 until 2007, as well as in 2009.

Professional career
Klassen lost a decision to Robert Guerrero on August 22, 2009.

Professional boxing record

See also
List of super-featherweight boxing champions

References

External links

1981 births
Living people
Featherweight boxers
Super-featherweight boxers
Lightweight boxers
World super-featherweight boxing champions
International Boxing Federation champions
International Boxing Organization champions
Sportspeople from Gauteng
South African male boxers